USS Draco (AK-79) was a  commissioned by the US Navy for service in World War II. Named after the constellation Draco. She was responsible for delivering goods and equipment to locations in the war zone.

Construction
Draco was laid down 15 December 1942, as SS John M. Palmer, MCE hull 453, by Permanente Metals Corporation, Yard No. 2, Richmond, California, under a Maritime Commission (MARCOM) contract; launched 19 January 1943, and  sponsored by Miss Gayle Marie Sanfacon. She was transferred to the Navy 31 January 1943; and commissioned 16 February 1943.

Service history
Draco towed  from Seattle, Washington, by way of Pearl Harbor to Espiritu Santo, arriving 5 May 1943. She carried cargo from Auckland, New Zealand, to bases on Nouméa, Espiritu Santo, Guadalcanal, and the Fiji Islands, and acted in support of the consolidation of the Solomons, the invasions of Cape Torokina, Bougainville, and Emirau. From 27 July to 10 August 1944 she unloaded cargo at Guam in the capture and occupation of that island, then returned to cargo runs between New Zealand and the Solomons until arriving at Ulithi 26 May 1945.

Draco sailed from Ulithi 20 June 1945, for Okinawa, where she discharged Army supplies from 26 June to 12 July. Sailing by way of Guadalcanal to load salvaged equipment and vehicles, Draco arrived at Tacoma, Washington, 27 August 1945.

Post-war decommissioning
Draco was decommissioned 28 November 1945, and returned to MARCOM for disposal the same day. She entered the National Defense Reserve Fleet, James River Group, Lee Hall, Virginia, 28 November 1945.

Merchant service
On 9 August 1947, she was sold to the South African company, Southern Steamship Proprietary, Ltd., and renamed President Kruger. She was again sold in 1951, and renamed Riviera. In 1953, she was sold and renamed Effie. She was renamed President Pretorius in 1958, and finally sold in April 1968, to be scrapped at Kaohsiung, Taiwan.

Awards
Draco received two battle stars for World War II service.

References

Bibliography

External links

Crater-class cargo ships
World War II auxiliary ships of the United States
Ships built in Richmond, California
1943 ships
James River Reserve Fleet